Manypenny is a surname. Notable people with the surname include:

 George Washington Manypenny (1808–1892), American government official and newspaperman
 Mike Manypenny (born 1959), American politician

See also
 Manypenny Agreement